Marcerra Kuantan  Football Association (Malay: Persatuan Bolasepak Daerah Kuantan) is a defunct Malaysian football club based in Kuala Lumpur, Malaysia. The club was established in 1970 and began competing in the local league as Kuantan FA. In early 2018, the club's right was sold to Marcerra United and they decided to rename the club as Marcerra Kuantan FA as a symbol of the club's new start.

Some of the locals consider calling the club as the A.S. Roma of Malaysian Football due to the club sharing the same kit color scheme with the Serie A side .

On the 21st of April 2018, the club has officially withdrew by the orders of Football Association of Malaysia due to the ongoing off field issues. The club on the last season played in the Malaysia Premier League.

The club most prestigious achievement was winning the 2014 FAM League and achieving promotion to the Malaysia Premier League. Kuantan FA won the league with two matches to spare, their first title in their 2-year FAM League participation, after a 1–1 draw with MOF FC on 20 June 2014.

Former Kuantan FA head coach, Ismail Zakaria revealed to FOX Sports Asia in an article that "The situation got so bad we had to use our own transport to get to matches, because the club’s bus driver was not paid. We also got chased out of our training ground, it was shameful."

History
The club were originally based in Kuantan, Pahang and played their home games at Darulmakmur Stadium.

In 2018, the club has been taken over by the management of Marcerra United F.C., and for the 2018 season, the club were renamed as Marcerra Kuantan FA. The club base also moved to Kuala Lumpur from Kuantan.

Stadium
Prior to its purchase by Marcerra United F.C. and its defunct, the club originally played most of its matches in Darul Makmur Stadium in Kuantan, Pahang. The club's original birthplace.

The previous owner and chairman of the club had planned to the club out of Darul Makmur Stadium and build their own stadium somewhere near Kuantan. They felt that it was necessary to move out of Darul Makmur Stadium and out of Pahang FA's shadow in order for the club to grow and gain popularity among the locals . Some rumoured the planned stadium site was located in Tanjung Lumpur. Though the planned didn't go on possibly because of their lacked of financial backing .

In 2018 after Marcerra United F.C. 
"Successfully" purchased the clubs right, they moved their home ground and played at MP Selayang Stadium in Selangor  until the Football Association of Malaysia sanctioned the club to close down in April 2018 after the ongoing issue of the players and staffs of the club not receiving salary for a few months.

Notable former players
List of former players who played professionally or have represented there nation at senior level. 
Malaysia 
 Malik Ariff
 Shazalee Ramlee
 Helmi Remeli
 Abdul Manaf Mamat
 Abdul Hadi Yahya
 Daudsu Jamaluddin
 Zairul Fitree Ishak
Timor-Leste 
 Murilo de Almeida
South Korea 
 Lee Kwang-Hyun
Serbia
 Ljubo Baranin
Montenegro 
 Milan Purović
Romania
 Alexandru Tudose
Haiti
 Fabrice Noël
Brazil
 Andrezinho

Coaching staff

 Head coach: Ismail Zakaria
 Assistant coach: Rusdi Suparman

Coaches
Coaches by Years (2013–2018)

Achievements

Honours

League
Division 3/ FAM Cup/ FAM League
 Winners (3) : 1975, 1977, 2014
 Runners-up : 1974, 1976

Kits

References

External links
 Official Facebook

 
Malaysia Premier League clubs
Football clubs in Malaysia
Kuantan